Henry Franklin Winkler (born October 30, 1945) is an American actor, executive producer, and director.

Winkler initially rose to fame for his role as Arthur "Fonzie" Fonzarelli (on the 1974-1984 American television series Happy Days), winning two Golden Globe Awards and three Emmy Award nominations for Outstanding Lead Actor in a Comedy Series for the role. He also earned a nomination for the Golden Globe Award for Best Actor – Motion Picture Drama for his portrayal of Jack Dunne in Heroes (1977), and was nominated for the Golden Globe Award for Best Actor – Motion Picture Musical or Comedy for his role as Chuck Lumley in the film Night Shift (1982). In addition, he gained recognition as an executive producer, winning a Genesis Award for MacGyver, the Bronze Wrangler for Dead Man's Gun, and the Daytime Emmy for Outstanding Children's Special for the CBS Schoolbreak Special: "All the Kids Do It." He also received a Daytime Emmy nomination for Hollywood Squares, and a Primetime Emmy nomination for the televised version of Who Are the DeBolts? And Where Did They Get Nineteen Kids?.

Winkler was nominated for a Primetime Emmy, Outstanding Guest Actor in a Drama Series, for his role as Dr. Henry Olson on The Practice. He also portrayed Barry Zuckerkorn in Arrested Development (for which he received the Gold Derby Award) and Gene Cousineau in Barry (for which he received two Golden Globe nominations, five Screen Actors Guild Awards nominations, and a number of awards for the role: the Critics' Choice Television Award for Best Supporting Actor in a Comedy Series (2019) and (2023), Hollywood Critics Association TV Awards (2022), and the 2018 Primetime Emmy Award for Outstanding Supporting Actor in a Comedy Series).

Major Associations

Emmy Awards

† Nomination withdrawn when it was pointed out later that the episode had aired after the Emmy's May 31 deadline.

Golden Globe Awards

†† Tied with Ron Howard, also for Happy Days

Screen Actors Guild Awards

Miscellaneous awards

CableACE Award

Critics' Choice Television Award

Genesis Awards

Hollywood Critics Association TV Awards

Western Heritage Awards

Honors

See also
List of Henry Winkler performances

References

External links
 Awards won by Henry Winkler at IMDb
Henry Winkler Hollywood Walk of Fame Star 
 Henry Winkler presents the Oscar for Art Direction-with Greer Garson for Star Wars IV, at the Academy Awards, 1978.
70th Emmy Awards: Henry Winkler Wins For Outstanding Supporting Actor In A Comedy Series - Academy of Television Arts & Sciences, Sep 18, 2018.
Henry Winkler's "Happy Days" Costars Surprise Him at 2019 Globes | E! Red Carpet & Award Shows - E! January 6, 2019

Winkler, Henry